Fredrik Flo (born 10 October 1996) is a Norwegian footballer who plays for Øygarden.

Career
In the second half of 2016 he was loaned out to Fana. He is the son of Håvard Flo.

He was loaned out to Bryne in 2017 and Fana again in 2018. In 2019 he transferred to Sotra. In 2020 he transferred to Øygarden.

Personal life
He is the son of former Werder Bremen and Wolverhampton Wanderers striker Håvard Flo.

Career statistics

Club

References

1996 births
Living people
Norwegian footballers
Norwegian First Division players
Eliteserien players
Sogndal Fotball players
Fana IL players
Bryne FK players
Øygarden FK players
Association football forwards
Flo family